Rob Kirwan  is record producer, mixing engineer and audio engineer based in Dublin, Ireland. He has worked with such artists as Hozier, PJ Harvey, Local Natives, U2, Depeche Mode, Editors, Glasvegas, The Courteeners, The Horrors, The Pains of Being Pure at Heart, Bell X1, Delorentos, Soulsavers, Soulwax and Sneaker Pimps.

Early life
Born 14 January 1970 in Dún Laoghaire, Dublin, Ireland, Kirwan was educated at St. Columba's College, Dublin.

Career 
Kirwan worked as an Assistant Engineer at Windmill Lane Recording Studios from 1992-1995. Within his first year he worked on the U2 album Zooropa and then went on to work with renowned producers such as Flood, Brian Eno, Steve Lillywhite, Stephen Street, Geoff Emrick, Nellee Hooper and Don Was. He also worked with Artists such as PJ Harvey, The Cranberries, Simple Minds, Kris Kristofferson, Willie Nelson, Elvis Costello and Sinead O'Connor. From 1995-1998 Rob worked as an Engineer for U2 at their own studio. He then moved to London as a freelance engineer, producer and mixer and worked there for ten years before he relocated to Berlin, Germany. After a year he returned to Dublin where he now has his own studio, Exchequer Studios, in the heart of Dublin city centre.

Awards and nominations

Grammy Awards

Mercury Prize

Choice Music Prize

Selected mixing/production/engineering credits

References

1970 births
Living people
Musicians from Dublin (city)
Irish record producers
Audio engineers